Sigrun Krause (later Filbrich, born 28 January 1954) is a retired East German cross-country skier who competed during the 1970s. She won a bronze medal in the 4 × 5 km relay at the 1976 Winter Olympics in Innsbruck.

Krause also won a silver in the 4 × 5 km relay at the 1974 FIS Nordic World Ski Championships in Falun.

She is married to former cross-country skier, coach and sports official Wolfgang Filbrich, and is the mother of cross-country skier Jens Filbrich.

Cross-country skiing results

Olympic Games
 1 medal – (1 bronze)

World Championships
 1 medal – (1 silver)

References

External links
Women's cross country results: 1952–2006
World Championship results 

Cross-country skiers at the 1976 Winter Olympics
German female cross-country skiers
1954 births
Living people
Olympic medalists in cross-country skiing
FIS Nordic World Ski Championships medalists in cross-country skiing
Medalists at the 1976 Winter Olympics
Olympic bronze medalists for East Germany